Béni Khiar is a town and commune in the Nabeul Governorate, Tunisia. As of 2004 it had a population of 16,992. One of beautiful towns in Nabeul with beautiful beach, great weather especially in the summer people come from all over the country and from Algeria to spend their summer holidays here in Bni khiar.

See also
List of cities in Tunisia

References

Populated places in Tunisia
Communes of Tunisia
Tunisia geography articles needing translation from French Wikipedia